The Allegheny County District Attorney is the elected district attorney for Pittsburgh and Allegheny County, Pennsylvania. The office is responsible for the prosecution of violations of Pennsylvania commonwealth laws. (Federal law violations are prosecuted by the U.S. Attorney for the Western District of Pennsylvania). The current District Attorney is Stephen Zappala.

In 1995 the Assistant District Attorneys formed a collective bargaining unit and voted to be represented by the United Steelworkers of America. The bargaining unit also represents Assistant Public Defenders, Scientists in the Coroner's Office (now the Office of Medical Examiner) and computer professionals in the Prothonotary's Office (now the Department of Court Records.)

History
Stephen Zappala (Democrat) 1998–present
Robert E. Colville (Democrat) 1976–1998
John Hickton (Democrat) 1974–1976
Robert Duggan (Republican) 1964–1974 (died in office)
Edward C. Boyle (Democrat) 1956–1964
James F. Malone (Republican) 1952–1956
William Rahauser (Democrat) 1948–1952
Artemas Leslie (Republican) 1945–1948
Russell H. Adams (Republican) 1942–1945
Andrew T. Park 1930–1942
Samuel H. Gardner 1923??–1930
Rowan February 7, 1922
R.H. Jackson April 11, 1914 – Before May 1922
William Augustus Blakeley 1908–1914
Harry L. Goehring Jan 1907–1908
James Musial Jan. 1, 1904 – Jan. 1, 1907
Underwood Feb 16 1904 
John Carothers Haymaker Jan. 1, 1895 – Jan. 1, 1904
Clarence Burleigh 1892 – Jan. 1, 1895 became city solicitor after office

See also

 Allegheny County Police Department
 Allegheny County Sheriff
 District Attorney
 List of law enforcement agencies in Pennsylvania
 Pittsburgh Police

References

External links
 Allegheny County District Attorney website

Lawyers from Pittsburgh
County district attorneys in Pennsylvania